Man in Outer Space AKA The Man from the First Century is a 1962 Czechoslovak science fiction comedy film directed by Oldřich Lipský. It was entered into the 1962 Cannes Film Festival.

Cast
 Miloš Kopecký as Josef, an upholsterer
 Radovan Lukavský as Adam
 Otomar Krejča as Academic
 Vít Olmer as Engineer Petr
 Anita Kajlichova as Psychiatrist Eva
 Lubomír Lipský as Order fulfillment clerk
 Vladimír Hlavatý as Director of the Rocket factory
 Josef Hlinomaz as Foreman

References

External links
 

1962 films
1962 comedy films
1960s science fiction comedy films
1960s Czech-language films
Czechoslovak science fiction comedy films
Czech science fiction comedy films
Czechoslovak black-and-white films
Films directed by Oldřich Lipský
1960s Czech films